Minoritenkirche (German - Church of the Friars Minor) may refer to:
Minoritenkirche (Cologne)
Minoritenkirche (Vienna)